Crown Racing (previously called Voxx Racing and Cimed Racing), is a Brazilian auto racing team based in Petropolis, Rio de Janeiro.

References

External links

See also
 WA Mattheis

Stock Car Brasil teams
2013 establishments in Brazil

Auto racing teams established in 2013
Brazilian auto racing teams